"Trust Me" is a song by Swedish singer Pandora (a.k.a. Anneli Magnusson), released in October 1993 as the first single from her debut album, One of a Kind (1993). It is written and produced by Sir Martin & The Dr. Maxx Family, and also features an uncredited rap by rapper K-Slim. On the Swedish Singles Chart, it peaked at number three and was certified gold, as the most sold single of the year in Sweden. Additionally, "Trust Me" was a top 10 hit also in Denmark, Finland, Israel and Norway.

In September 2006, a remix of the song was released by United DJ's vs. Pandora, peaking at number two in Sweden.

Background and release
Singer Anneli Magnusson from Västerås, Sweden studied to make it to the university. She was asked to record some demos she’d been singing in a small studio in her hometown. These demos ended up at EMI Sweden’s office. In the autumn of 1993 she signed a contract with the record company and released "Trust Me" under the nama Pandora. She was 23-years old.

Critical reception
Swedish newspaper Aftonbladet stated that the song "is certainly an irresistible hit". Billboard magazine described it as a "upbeat and direct" track. A reviewer from Music & Media commented that "out of the Swedish box of Pandora rolls a pop/dance song as direct and catchy as Sabrina's Boys (Summertime Love). Oh Boy, a hit!"

Chart performance
"Trust Me" was very successful on the charts in several countries in Europe. It peaked at number three in the singer's native Sweden, earning a gold record for becoming the most sold single of the year there. In Finland, it reached its highest chart position, as number two. In Norway, it made it to number eight, while in Denmark, it peaked at number ten. On the European Hot 100 Singles, "Trust Me" peaked at number 28. Outside Europe, it was a huge hit in Israel, reaching number five. It also charted in Australia, peaking at number 82.

Music video
A music video was produced to promote the single. It was later published on Pandora's official YouTube channel in May 2012. The video has amassed more than 499,000 views as of September 2021.

Track listing
 CD single
"Trust Me" (Radio Edit) – 3:26
"Trust Me" (Club Extended) – 5:34

 CD maxi / 12"
"Trust Me" (Radio Edit) – 3:26
"Trust Me" (Club Extended) – 5:34
"Trust Me" (Club Extended Deep) – 8:01

Charts

Certifications

United DJ's vs. Pandora remix

In 2006, "Trust Me" was remixed and re-released by United DJs vs. Pandora. The song was released in September 2006 as the lead single from United DJs vs. Pandora's album, Celebration (2007).

The song peaked at number two on the Swedish Singles Chart, spending 32 weeks in the top 50.

Track listing
 CD single, Sweden (2006)
"Trust Me" (Radio Edit) – 3:47
"Trust Me" (Extended) – 6:09

Charts

References

1993 debut singles
2006 singles
1993 songs
English-language Swedish songs
Capitol Records singles
Virgin Records singles
Pandora (singer) songs